Rio Ramandika (born 31 January 1989) is an Indonesian professional footballer who plays as a defender.

Club career

Persita Tangerang
Rio joined in the squad for Indonesia Soccer Championship, and he made his debut against Persikabo Bogor.

Perserang Serang
On 18 June 2021, Rio joined Perserang Serang from Persita Tangerang to play in 2021-22 Liga 2, he was contracted for one year with his friend while still in Persita, Egi Melgiansyah, Yogi Triana and Henry Rivaldi.

Honours

Club
Persita Tangerang
 Liga 2 runner-up: 2019

References

External links
 
 Rio Ramandika at Liga Indonesia

1989 births
Indonesian footballers
Living people
Association football defenders
Persita Tangerang players
Sportspeople from Jakarta